Varyomus is a genus of millipedes belonging to the family Aphelidesmidae.

The species of this genus are found in America.

Species:

Varyomus confluens 
Varyomus levigatus

References

Millipedes